40 Blue Fingers, Freshly Packed and Ready to Serve is the debut studio album by the blues band Chicken Shack, released in 1968. The album reached number 12 in the UK Albums Chart.

This album has three Freddy King covers; "Lonesome Whistle Blues" (written by Rudolph Toombs), "See See Baby" from Freddy King Sings; and "San-Ho-Zay" from Let's Hide Away and Dance Away.

Background 
Chicken Shack's first single “It's Okay With Me Baby / When My Left Eye Jumps” (BH 57-3135), was released in 1968 shortly before their first LP release 40 Blue Fingers, Freshly Packed and Ready to Serve was released later that year. Christine Perfect composed and sang on side A of the first single and Stan Webb composed and sang the song on the flip side. Neither side of the first single was included on the first LP release.
 The first non-album single and the debut LP attracted a lot of attention. 40 Blue Fingers… ended up having considerable chart success (No. 12 on the British Album Charts).

Stan Webb and Christine Perfect both wrote two songs for the album and the rest of the songs were blues covers. Webb sang lead vocals on all of his compositions as well as all of the covers. Perfect sang lead only on her compositions.

The entire album and the rest of the Chicken Shack sessions on Blue Horizon were made available on the CD compilation Chicken Shack – The Complete Blue Horizon Sessions in 2007.

Track listing

Personnel

Chicken Shack
Stan Webb – guitar, vocals
Christine Perfect – organ, vocals, piano
Andy Silvester – bass
Dave Bidwell – drums

Additional personnel
Alan Ellis – trumpet
Dick Heckstall-Smith – tenor saxophone
Johnny Almond – alto saxophone

Production
Producer – Mike Vernon
Engineer – Mike Ross
Studio – CBS
Photography and design – Terence Ibbott

References

1968 debut albums
Chicken Shack albums
Blue Horizon Records albums
Albums produced by Mike Vernon (record producer)